Sergei (or Sergey) Stepanov may refer to:

 Sergei Aleksandrovich Stepanov (born 1941), Russian mathematician
 Sergei Stepanov (footballer), born 1976
 Sergei Stepanov (politician) from Transnistria
 Sergey Stepanov (musician) (better known as "Epic Sax Guy"), a saxophonist, member of the SunStroke Project